Two ships and a shore establishment of the Royal Australian Navy (RAN) have been named HMAS Torrens, after the River Torrens.

 , a  commissioned in 1916, decommissioned in 1920, and sunk as a target in 1930
 , a naval depot at Port Adelaide, South Australia, operated from 1940 to 1964
 , a  commissioned in 1971, decommissioned in 1998, and sunk as a target in 1999

Battle honours
Ships named HMAS Torrens are entitled to carry a single battle honour:
Adriatic 1917–18

References

Royal Australian Navy ship names